The list of ship launches in 1821 includes a chronological list of some ships launched in 1821.


References

Sources

1821
Ship launches